Bolivia is a municipality and town in the Ciego de Ávila Province of Cuba. It is located in the north-eastern part of the province, bordering the Bay of Jiguey and Cayo Romano.

Demographics
In 2004, the municipality of Bolivia had a population of 16,612.

See also
Municipalities of Cuba
List of cities in Cuba
Bolivia Municipal Museum

References

External links

Populated places in Ciego de Ávila Province